The 2014 Chattanooga Mocs football team represented the University of Tennessee at Chattanooga in the 2014 NCAA Division I FCS football season as a member of the Southern Conference (SoCon). The Mocs were led by sixth-year head coach Russ Huesman and played their home games at Finley Stadium in Chattanooga, Tennessee. 2014 was a historic season for the Mocs. The Mocs won ten games in a season for the first time in program history, won the SoCon Conference outright for the first time in program history, went undefeated in the SoCon for the first time in program history, and went to the postseason for the first time since 1984, netting a number eight seed and a first-round bye. Chattanooga beat Indiana State at home for the program's first-ever home playoff win in the Second Round of the NCAA Division I Football Championship playoffs before falling to New Hampshire, 35–30, in the Quarterfinal.

Schedule

Ranking movements

NFL Draft Selections

References

Chattanooga
Chattanooga Mocs football seasons
Southern Conference football champion seasons
Chattanooga
Chattanooga Mocs football